Nyŏngbyŏn County (in standard Southern dialect: Yŏngbyŏn) is a county in North Pyŏngan Province, North Korea.  It borders the cities of Kaechŏn and Anju, and covers an area of 504 km2.

Description
The city was heavily fortified during the 15th century as a result of its strategic position, and  during the Josŏn dynasty, became a retreat for the aristocratic ryangban due to its fantastic scenery. The city's Yaksan, meaning medicine mountain, was well known for its azaleas; the modern poet Kim So-wol wrote one of his best-known poems on this subject. Two other mountains, Yaksan-dongdae, east of Yaksan, and Moran Hill are also scenic spots. Nyŏngbyŏn also houses many important relics, including the Chŏnju and Soun Buddhist temples, dating from 1345 and 1684 respectively; the Ryuksung Pavilion, famous for "six scenic views" of Nyŏngbyŏn; and the Ch'ŏl'ong Castle, built to protect the city during the Ri dynasty. The south gate of Nyŏngbyŏn, called Mannomun, is also nearby.

Administrative divisions
Nyŏngbyŏn county is divided into 1 ŭp (town), 1 rodongjagu (workers' district) and 26 ri (villages):

Economy
The Nyŏngbyŏn Nuclear Scientific Research Centre, a major component of the North Korean nuclear program, is located here.

Transportation
The Chŏngnyŏn Pharwŏn Line of the Korean State Railway passes through Nyŏngbyŏn county.

See also
 Administrative divisions of North Korea
 Geography of North Korea

References

External links
 Interactive map of Yongbyon site
 North Korea's nuclear facilities by Google Earth
 Map of Nyongbyon, in Korean

Counties of North Pyongan